Girl With A Pearl Earring is an oil painting by Dutch Golden Age painter Johannes Vermeer, dated  1665. Going by various names over the centuries, it became known by its present title towards the end of the 20th century after the earring worn by the girl portrayed there. The work has been in the collection of the Mauritshuis in The Hague since 1902 and has been the subject of various literary and cinematic treatments.

Description
The painting is a tronie, the Dutch 17th-century description of a "head" that was not meant to be a portrait. It depicts a European girl wearing "exotic dress", an "oriental turban", and what appears to be a very large pearl as an earring. In 2014, Dutch astrophysicist  raised doubts about the material of the earring and argued that it looks more like polished tin than pearl on the grounds of the specular reflection, the pear shape and the large size of the earring.

It is signed "IVMeer" but not dated. It is estimated to have been painted around 1665.

After the most recent restoration of the painting in 1994, the subtle colour scheme and the intimacy of the girl's gaze toward the viewer have been greatly enhanced. During the restoration, it was discovered that the dark background, today somewhat mottled, was originally a deep enamel-like green. This effect was produced by applying a thin transparent layer of paint—a glaze—over the black background seen now. However, the two organic pigments of the green glaze, indigo and weld, have faded.

Ownership and display

On the advice of Victor de Stuers, who for years tried to prevent Vermeer's rare works from being sold to parties abroad, Arnoldus Andries des Tombe purchased the work at an auction in The Hague in 1881, for only two guilders plus thirty cents buyer's premium (around €24 at current purchasing power). At the time, it was in poor condition, with parts of the paint layer having become detached. Des Tombe had no heirs and by a bequest donated this and other paintings to the Mauritshuis in 1902.

The painting was exhibited as part of a Vermeer show at the National Gallery of Art in Washington, D.C., in 1965 and 1966, and in another Vermeer exhibition in 1995-96. In 2012, as part of a travelling exhibition while the Mauritshuis was being renovated and expanded, the painting was exhibited in Japan at the National Museum of Western Art, Tokyo, and in 2013–2014 in the United States, where it was shown at the High Museum in Atlanta, the de Young Museum in San Francisco and in New York City at the Frick Collection. Later in 2014 it was exhibited in Bologna, Italy. In June 2014, it returned to the Mauritshuis museum which stated that the painting would not leave the museum in the future. Nevertheless, the painting is currently on show until 30th March 2023 at the Rijksmuseum in Amsterdam as part of their 2023 Vermeer exhibition.

As a result of its promotion, Girl with a Pearl Earring has become one of the world's most recognizable paintings and has been compared to the Mona Lisa. In 2006, the Dutch public selected it as the most beautiful painting in the Netherlands.

Painting technique
The painting was investigated by the scientists of the Netherlands Institute for Cultural Heritage and FOM Institute for Atomic and Molecular Physics (AMOLF) Amsterdam.

The ground is dense and yellowish in colour and is composed of chalk, lead white, ochre and very little black. The dark background of the painting contains bone black, weld (luteolin, Reseda luteola), chalk, small amounts of red ochre, and indigo. The face and draperies were painted mainly using ochres, natural ultramarine, bone black, charcoal black and lead white.

In February-March 2018 an international team of art experts spent two weeks studying the painting in a specially constructed glass workshop in the museum, open to observation by the public. The non-invasive research project included removing the work from its frame for study with microscopes, X-ray equipment and a special scanner to learn more about the methods and materials used by Vermeer. The project, with the name The Girl in the Spotlight, was headed by Abbie Vandivere, conservator at the Mauritshuis, and results were published by the Mauritshuis. A blog by Vandivere reveals many details of the project.

Results included the presence of delicate eyelashes, a green curtain behind the head, changes made, and details of the pigments used and where they came from. The lack of eyebrows and featureless background had led to speculation that Vermeer was painting an idealised or abstract face; the later discoveries showed that he was painting a real person in a real space. The pearl has been described as an illusion due to having "no contour and also no hook to hang it from the girl’s ear".

Painting title
The painting has gone under a number of titles in various countries over the centuries. Originally it may have been one of the two tronies "painted in the Turkish fashion" (Twee tronijnen geschildert op sijn Turx) recorded in the inventory at the time of Vermeer’s death. It may later have been the work appearing in the catalogue to a 1696 sale of painting in Amsterdam, where it is described as a "Portrait in Antique Costume, uncommonly artistic" (Een Tronie in Antique Klederen, ongemeen konstig).

After the bequest to the Mauritshuis, the painting became known as Girl with a Turban (Meisje met tulband) and it was noted of its original description in the 1675 inventory that the turban had become a fashion accessory of some fascination during the period of European wars against the Turks. By 1995, the title Girl with a Pearl (Meisje met de parel) was considered more appropriate.  Pearls, in fact, figure in 21 of Vermeer's pictures, including very prominently in Woman with a Pearl Necklace. Earrings alone are also featured in A Lady Writing a Letter, Study of a Young Woman, Girl with a Red Hat, and Girl with a Flute. Similarly shaped ear-pieces were used as convincing accessories in 20th-century fakes that were briefly attributed to Vermeer, such as Young Woman with a Blue Hat, Smiling Girl and The Lace Maker.

Generally, the English title of the painting was simply Head of a Young Girl, although it was sometimes known as The Pearl. One critic explained that this name was given, not just from the detail of the earring, but because the figure glows with an inner radiance against the dark background.

Cultural impact

Some of the first literary treatments of the painting were in poems. For Yann Lovelock in his sestina, "Vermeer’s Head of a Girl", it is the occasion for exploring the interplay between imagined beauty interpreted on canvas and living experience. W. S. Di Piero reimagined how the "Girl with Pearl Earring by Johannes Vermeer" might look in the modern setting of Haight Street in San Francisco, while Marilyn Chandler McEntyre commented on the girl's private, self-possessed personality.  

There have also been three fictional appearances. As La ragazza col turbante (Girl with a Turban, 1986), it features as the general title of Marta Morazzoni’s collection of five short novellas set in the Baroque era. In the course of the title story, a Dutch art dealer sells Vermeer’s painting to an eccentric Dane in the year 1658. Indifferent to women in real life, the two men can only respond to the idealization of the feminine in art. In the following decade, Iain McClure's 1996 BBC radio play 'Paint Her Well', takes inspiration from Vermeer's painting (and his life) in its story of a king searching for a woman he has painted, having dreamt about her. The mysterious young woman, ethereally beautiful, her large pearl earring catching light from the left, is otherwise in darkness.  Tracy Chevalier's 1999 historical novel Girl with a Pearl Earring fictionalized the circumstances of the painting's creation. There, Vermeer becomes close to a servant whom he uses as an assistant and has sit for him as a model while wearing his wife's earrings. The novel was adapted into a 2003 film of the same name and a 2008 play. 

The painting also appeared in the 2007 film St Trinian's, where a group of unruly schoolgirls steal it to raise funds to save their school. At that period, too, fellow artists made iconic use of Vermeer's painting. Ethiopian American Awol Erizku recreated it as a print in 2009, centering a young black woman and replacing the pearl earring with bamboo earrings as a commentary on the lack of black figures in museums and galleries. His piece is titled Girl with a Bamboo Earring. And in 2014 the English street artist Banksy reproduced the painting as a mural in Bristol, incorporating an alarm box in place of the pearl earring and calling the artwork Girl with a Pierced Eardrum.

A climate protestor representing the Just Stop Oil campaign attempted to glue his head to the glass protecting the painting in October 2022, and was covered in tomato soup by another protestor. The protest did not damage the painting, and three people were arrested for public violence against goods.

References

Further reading

External links

 In-depth view of the Girl with a Pearl Earring
 Analysis of the Girl with a Pearl Earring
 An investigation into the illumination of Vermeer’s Girl with a Pearl Earring
 Vermeer, Girl with a Pearl Earring, ColourLex
February 2018 NYT Article
 Essential Vermeer, mouse over its image to discover details
 Girl with a Pearl Earring at the website of the Mauritshuis

1660s paintings
Genre paintings by Johannes Vermeer
Paintings in the collection of the Mauritshuis
Portraits of women